Mimanillus gracilis is a species of beetle in the family Carabidae, the only species in the genus Mimanillus.

References

Trechinae